Mexico has a variety of cultures which came from European and Mesoamerican cultures. This mix of cultures leads to the creation of traditional tales and narrations better known as myths and legends.

Myths

Myths are narrations that tell us about the origin of gods, of the creation of our world and space. The importance of both types of tales is that they are created inside the context of a group and as a result they can be used to see the different characteristics of the group's culture. They usually show us religion, beliefs or try to explain natural phenomena.

Legends

Legends are stories created by anonymous authors with some basis in history but with many embellishments. They talk about facts that occurred in the near past and which characters can or cannot be human. Legends show us the vision of the world and the life that people had with, historical, political, philosophical, and cultural value.

Colonial Mexico Tales

During Colonial era in Mexico, new narrations began to appear. Many of them created from the mix of religion and past belief tried to mix indigenous and Christian-Catholic beliefs.

Pregnant woman and the Eclipse
In Mexico it is believed that exposure of a pregnant woman to an eclipse will cause her infant to have a cleft lip or palate.

The belief originated with the Aztecs, who thought that an eclipse occurred because a bite had been taken out of the moon. If the pregnant woman viewed the eclipse, her infant would have a bite taken out of its mouth.

An obsidian knife was placed on the woman's abdomen before going out at night to protect her.

This belief remains intact hundreds of years later, the only difference being that today a metal key or safety pin is used for protection. The key or safety pin is used for attacking moonlight.

The transported soldier legend
On October 24, 1593, the soldier was guarding the Palacio del Gobernador in Manila in the Captaincy General of the Philippines. The night before, Governor Gómez Pérez Dasmariñas was assassinated by Chinese pirates, but the guards still guarded the palace and awaited the appointment of a new governor. The soldier began to feel dizzy and exhausted. He leaned against the wall and rested for a moment with his eyes closed.

When he opened his eyes a few seconds later, he found himself in Mexico City, in the Viceroyalty of New Spain, thousands of kilometres across the ocean. Some guards found him in the wrong uniform and began to question who he was. The news of the assassination of the Governor of the Philippines was still unknown to the people in Mexico City. The transported soldier was reportedly wearing the palace guards' uniform in Manila and knew of his death. (In fact, Pérez Dasmariñas was killed at sea some distance from Manila.)

The authorities placed him in jail for being a deserter and with charges of being a servant of the devil. Months later, news of the governor's death came to Mexico on a galleon from the Philippines. One of the passengers recognized the imprisoned soldier and said that he had seen him in the Philippines a day after the death of the Governor. He was eventually released from jail by the authorities and allowed to go back home.

See also
House of Count de la Torre de Cossio
Ghosts in Mexican culture

References

Rogelio Álvarez, José. Leyendas Mexicanas 1 (Mexican Legends). (1998). Editorial Evergráficas. España. 
Rogelio Álvarez, José. Leyendas Mexicanas 2 (Mexican Legends). (1998). Editorial Evergráficas. España. 
Perez Reguera García, Alejandra. Pérez Reguera M. de E. Alfonso. México, nación de mítos, valores y símbolos (Mexico, nation of myths, values and symbols). (2002). Instituto Mexicano de Contadores Públicos. México. .
Krickeberg Walter. Mytos y leyendas de los Aztecas, Incas, Mayas y Muiscas (Myths and legends from Aztecs, Incas, Mayas and Muisca). (2000). Fondo de Cultura Económica. México. 
Scheffler Lilian. Cuentos y leyendas de México (Tales and leyends from Mexico). (1991). Panorama editorial. México. 

Mexican culture
Mexican folklore